Zard Dopehar is a fourteen episodes Pakistani television melodrama serial, first aired on PTV Home in 1995. It portrayed rise of a bald, middle-class Lahori politician, Malik Mehrban Ali (which at that time, was universally accepted as depiction of former prime minister Nawaz Sharif).

History 
Zard Dopehar was written in spring 1993 by Shahid Nadeem. The drama was not given permission to be produced by-then government of the PLMN. The PPPP's government allowed the drama to be produced, after winning the elections. It was aired on PTV Home in 1995.

Plot 
Story of the drama revolves around a popular industrialist Mehrban Ali from Walled City of Lahore, who starts his political career as a councilor. But soon with help of flattery of hidden characters and his cleverness, he becomes minister. But then his downfall begins when his political skills starts to become his hurdles. And ringmasters (hidden characters) becomes exasperated of him.

Another story in the drama is of Saira Begum, sister of Mehrban Ali. Her brother doesn't allow her to marry a university fellow, in fear of division of the inherited property. In the drama, women activism can be seen.

Cast 
 Shahid Nadeem, director
 Anmol as Parveen
 Enver Sajjad as Mastan
 Madeeha Gauhar as Saira
 Nadira as Laila
 Naima Khan as Shahida Nabeel
 Samina Peerzada as Zetoon
 Samiya Mumtaz as Sanyya
 Zahid Qureshi as Akhtar
 Salman Shahid as Nabeel
 Ismat Tahira as Tariq's aunt
 Shujaat Hashmi as Malik Meharban Ali
 Ghayyur Akhtar as Police officer
 Dildar as Worker
 Altaf ur Rehman as Judge
 Meher-Un-Nissa as Mehra Begum
 Azra Butt as Dadi
 Aurangzeb Laghari as Officer
 Asim Bukhari as Javed

References

External links
 
 

Pakistan Television Corporation original programming
Urdu-language television shows
Pakistani drama television series
1990s Pakistani television series